The Titograd District was a former district within Montenegro. The administrative centre of the Titograd District was Titograd (modern-day Podgorica)

Municipalities
The district encompassed the municipalities of:
Danilovgrad
Golubovci
Kolašin
Lijeva Rijeka
Manastir Morača
Titograd
Tuzi

Demographics

See also
Districts of Montenegro
Administrative divisions of Montenegro

Districts of Montenegro